Barchaniella inspersus is a moth in the family Cossidae. It was described by Hugo Theodor Christoph in 1887. It is found in Kyrgyzstan, Afghanistan, Kazakhstan, Uzbekistan, Turkmenistan, north-western China and south-western Mongolia.

The length of the forewings is 12–16 mm for males and 13–17 mm for females. The forewings are light brown with a weak light pattern. The hindwings are almost white. Adults are on wing from April to August.

The larvae live inside the trunks of Haloxylon species, in which they overwinter twice.

References

Cossinae genus list at Butterflies and Moths of the World of the Natural History Museum, London

Cossinae
Moths described in 1882
Moths of Asia